Collita gina is a moth of the family Erebidae. It is found in Japan (Honshu, Tsushima island).

The wingspan is 17–19 mm. The forewings and hindwings are grey-brown.

References

Moths described in 1955
Lithosiina